Christ the Redeemer, a reference to Jesus Christ as the Redeemer of humanity, may refer to:

Sculpture
Christ the Redeemer (statue), Rio de Janeiro, Brazil
Christ of Vũng Tàu, in Vũng Tàu, Vietnam 
Christ the Redeemer of the Andes, on the Argentine-Chilean border
Cristo della Minerva by Michelangelo, in Rome
Cristo Redentore sculpture in Maratea, Italy

Other uses
Redeemer (Christianity), the theological concept of Jesus as redeemer
Christ the Redeemer (icon), a 15th-century Russian icon
Christ the Redeemer (Mantegna), a 1493 painting by Andrea Mantegna
Christ the Redeemer Parish, in Azerbaijan
Cristo Redentor (album), a 1968 album by Harvey Mandel
"Cristo Redentor", a song on Charlie Musselwhite's 1967 album Stand Back! Here Comes Charley Musselwhite's Southside Band
 Covered by David Sanborn on the 2003 album Time Again 
Paso Internacional Los Libertadores, a mountain pass in the Andes also known as Cristo Redentor

See also
Christ the Redeemer Church (disambiguation)